Cemophora is a genus of snakes in the family Colubridae. The genus contains two species, which are endemic to the United States.

Species
Cemophora coccinea 
Cemophora coccinea coccinea  – Florida scarlet snake
Cemophora coccinea copei  – northern scarlet snake
Cemophora lineri  – Texas scarlet snake

References

Further reading
Boulenger GA (1894). Catalogue of the Snakes in the British Museum (Natural History). Volume II., Containing the Conclusion of the Colubridæ Aglyphæ. London: Trustees of the British Museum (Natural History). (Taylor and Francis, printers). xi + 382 pp. + Plates I-XX. (Genus Cemophora, p. 213).
Cope ED (1860). "Catalogue of the Colubridæ in the Museum of the Academy of Natural Sciences of Philadelphia, with notes and descriptions of new species. Part 2". Proc. Acad. Nat. Sci. Philadelphia 12: 241–266. (Cemophora, new genus, p. 244).
Wright AH, Wright AA (1957). Handbook of Snakes of the United States and Canada.  Ithaca and London: Comstock Publishing Associates, a division of Cornell University Press. 1,105 pp. (in 2 volumes). (Genus Cemophora, pp. 111–113).

 
Snake genera